The Cathedral Basilica of the Nativity of the Blessed Virgin Mary  also called Tarnów Cathedral is a religious building belonging to the Catholic Church and is located in the city of Tarnów in the European country of Poland.

It is a Gothic church, rebuilt in later periods. The building has three naves with an elongated chancel and west tower added that one rises 72 meters.

It is a cathedral dedicated to the Nativity of the Virgin Mary from 1783 and Basilica since 1972. In the oldest part of the church was built at the current location of the city in 1330.

It was visited by Pope John Paul II in 1987.

See also
Roman Catholicism in Poland
Cathedral Basilica of the Nativity of the Blessed Virgin Mary

References

Tarnów
Buildings and structures in Tarnów
Tarnów
The Most Holy Virgin Mary, Queen of Poland